This list contains the names of albums that contain a hidden track and also information on how to find them. Not all printings of an album contain the same track arrangements, so some copies of a particular album may not have the hidden track(s) listed below. Some of these tracks may be hidden in the pregap, and some hidden simply as a track following the listed tracks. The list is ordered by artist name using the surname where appropriate.

 Fairport Convention, Liege & Lief: At the end of disc two on the deluxe edition, a medley plays as track 10. Although unlisted on the back cover, the liner sleeve notes its appearance.
 Falco, Out of the Dark (1998 release): "Geld" (engl. money) at the end of the album, following "Naked" after a gap
 Fall Out Boy, Folie à Deux: Rewinding the first track by 2 minutes reveals the hidden track "Lullabye."
 Farin Urlaub, Am Ende der Sonne: "Noch einmal" in the pregap of "Mehr" on CD, after "Dusche" on vinyl
 Mylène Farmer:
 Avant que l'ombre...: "Nobody Knows" was not listed as track 15.
 Point de Suture: "Ave Maria" following the 10th track, "Si j'avais au moins..."
 Fatboy Slim:
 You've Come a Long Way, Baby: An interlude in the style of a radio request plays at the end of track 1, seguing into track 2. The radio request suggests that the DJ plays track 2
 Halfway Between the Gutter and the Stars: At the 9-minute mark in the last track, "Song for Shelter," is the "Talkin' Bout My Baby (Reprise)." It gets separated on download versions as a 2:26 track, but regardless, all versions technically have the two songs combined as "Song for Shelter" seamlessly segues into the reprise.
 The Fauves, Future Spa: "Everybody's Getting A Three Piece Together" on the final track, followed by an amusing police interview of two band members regarding a marijuana arrest and caution.
 Kevin Federline, Playing With Fire: After 4 minutes and 20 seconds after the last track "Kept on Talkin'," the hidden track "Middle Finger" plays.
 Feeder, Yesterday Went Too Soon: "Bubblehead" plays at 9:54mins of the final track, "Paperfaces"
 The Feeling, Twelve Stops and Home: "Miss you" begins to play around a minute after the final track on the album, "Blue Piccadilly" ends.
 Fergie, The Dutchess: After the track "Finally" finishes, a hidden track titled "Maybe We Can Take a Ride" starts playing.
 Finntroll, Ur Jordens Djup: "Trollvisan" following the last song "Kvällning" after a long gap.
 Fiction Plane, Everything Will Never Be OK: "Bongo" following the last song "Wise" after five minutes of silence.
 FIDLAR, FIDLAR: "Cocaine," the last listed song on the album, is followed by "Cheap Cocaine" after a brief silence of one minute and five seconds.
 Fight, War of Words: A hidden song called 'Jesus Saves' on the last track after a few minutes of silence.
 Filter, Title of Record: An untitled hidden track of spoken dialogue and screams follows the last song "Miss Blue" after about twelve minutes of silence.
 The 14th and "final" track, "Battlestar," of Five's album "Invincible" is followed by 40 consecutive tracks each comprising 5 seconds of complete silence, and then the hidden track "Inspector Gadget."
 Five Finger Death Punch, Got Your Six: A voicemail from "Jeklyll and Hyde" is played after the bonus track, "I Apologize".
 Five for Fighting, America Town: The hidden song "Do You Mind?" begins playing after 15 seconds of silence following the final listed track, "Alright."
 Five Furious Fish: Hook Line & Sphincter: After the last, ninth track, a hidden track (the voice of a disturbing man talking) is heard.
 Five Iron Frenzy:
 Our Newest Album Ever!: "The Godzilla Song" following the final song "Every New Day"
 Quantity Is Job 1: Tracks 9 through 17, the 8-part rock opera "These Are Not My Pants," are not listed, with 3 alternates takes of "When I Go Out" and "Kingdom of the Dinosaurs" following at the end of track 17.
 All the Hype That Money Can Buy: The brief greeting "What's Up?," which is listed as track 0, can be found by rewinding a few seconds at the beginning of track 1.
 Five O'Clock Heroes, Bend to the Breaks: "A song with no known name is included on the last song of the album, called Give It Up.
 The Fixx, Walkabout: On early pressings of their 1986 CD, one minute after the last song "Camphor" ends, a hidden 6-minute untitled song, which in 1994 is revealed to be called "Do What You Can." The track listing shows "Camphor" with a running time of 10:46, which is the combined running time for both tracks. Pressings showing "Camphor" at 3:53 do not include the hidden track.
 The Flaming Lips, Hit to Death in the Future Head: The last track is an unlisted 30-minute loop of a static sample.
 The Fireman, Electric Arguments: The last song contains a bonus track titled "Road Trip," which begins at 7:57.
 Béla Fleck and the Flecktones, Little Worlds: A hidden track called "Introduction" is hidden in the pregap before the first track.
 Flickerstick, Welcoming Home the Astronauts: "Execution by X-Mas Lights" at the end of the album, on some releases.
 Fleurety:
 Last-Minute Lies: Track 4 is unlisted.
 Department of Apocalyptic Affairs: Track 9 is unlisted on the back cover.
 Flyleaf, Memento Mori: "Uncle Bobby" a pre-gap track listed as -4:28 on "Beautiful Bride".
 FM Static, What Are You Waiting For?: "Hey Now," an unlisted song on Track 11 preceded by 6:39 of silence.
 Ben Folds, supersunnyspeedgraphic: At the 6:19 mark of the last song, "Still," fourteen seconds after the song concludes, is an instrument-by-instrument reprise of the fadeout of the song "Bitches Ain't Shit."
 Foo Fighters, Greatest Hits: On the DVD's main menu screen, there is a bullet hole that you can click on and it shows Dave Grohl playing the song "Home" on piano. Also, go to video select, go to the last page, and there is another bullet hole you can click on and it shows the music video for "No Way Back."
 Forbidden:
 Distortion: "Annexanax" can be heard after 1:30 of silence of the last track.
 Green: Track 14 is a short backward sped up version of the track "Face Down Heroes". Tracks 11-13 are silent.
 Forbidden Broadway: Rude Awakening, Spoof of Patti LuPone.
 ¡Forward, Russia!, Give Me A Wall: By rewinding before 0:00 of Thirteen you can hear an extended intro for the song which links it from the end of Eleven.
 Kim Fox, Moon Hut (1997): "Atlantic City" ends at 3:40, an untitled hidden track begins at 3:54.
 The Frames, Fitzcarraldo (1995 release): "Your Face" at the end of the album, following "Fitzcarraldo" after a gap.
 The Fratellis, Costello Music (Latinamerican release): "Cuntry Boys & City Girls" at the end of the album: Unlisted track following "Ole Black 'N' Blue Eyes."
 The Fratellis, Costello Music (U.S. Release): "Ole Black 'N' Blue Eyes": Unlisted track following "Got Ma Nuts from a Hippy."
 Fred Frith and Henry Kaiser, Friends & Enemies: two unlisted tracks at the end of the last track on each CD of the double album, preceded by 1:10 and 1:20 of silence respectively.
 From First to Last, Dear Diary, My Teen Angst Has a Body Count: An untitled track at the end of the album, nicknamed "Dead Baby Kickball" by many fans.
 Front 242, Tyranny (For You) (1991): "Hard Rock" & "Trigger 1" at the end of the album, following "Soul Manager" after a gap
 Front Line Assembly, FLAvour of the Weak (1997) has a hidden track some minutes after the last song "Predator"; as does their albums Implode, Epitaph, and Artificial Soldier.
 The Fucking Champs: VI: the last song "Column of Heads" ends at 6:00. After 7 minutes of silence (6:00 - 13:00), begins an untitled hidden track: it is a repeated riff taken from track no.4, "Fozzy Goes to Africa" with various extra samples mixed in. Ti repeated riff begins at 13:00 and ends at 14:46. 
 Fudge Tunnel:
 Teeth EP: a hidden drum solo starts after the final track "Like Jeff".
 The Complicated Futility of Ignorance: Track 12 is unlisted and contains five minute of silence before the song starts.
 Bobby Fuller Four, Never to Be Forgotten: Several minutes of silence at the end of disc one is followed by an instrumental rehearsal for "Never to Be Forgotten." Likewise, several minutes of silence at the end of disc two is followed by an instrumental rehearsal for "My True Love."
 Fun Lovin' Criminals: 100% Colombian contains a song called Fisty Nuts at track 14. Not mentioned on the sleeve listing but is mentioned in the liner notes.
 Loco includes a hidden track called "Kill The Bad Guy" at the end of "Little Song." This was a theme tune for the band's Maui Homicide 2000 movie and also appeared as a B Side to the Loco single.
 Mimosa includes Up On The Hill (Schmoove Instrumental) as a hidden track after "I'll Be Seeing You."
 Nelly Furtado, Mi Plan: After the last song "Feliz Cumpleaños" ends, there is a minute of silence and then the hidden track "Fantasma" plays. On digital versions of the album, "Fantasma" is listed as track 12.
 Fuser, Fuser: "A Matter of Trust (reprise)" plays after 110 seconds of silence after the final track. It is said to represent the 110 weeks since the forming of the band to the finish of the recording of the album.
 The nerdcore hip hop band Futuristic Sex Robotz's album Hotel Coral Essex included a hidden track at the end of their last song "Checking Out," which was a remake of the late 1980s hit "Just a Friend" by Biz Markie.
 Fuzzy Raisin, Fuzzy Raisin: An untitled instrumental track starts after the last song "All We Are" followed by a few tracks of silence

See also
 List of backmasked messages
 List of albums with tracks hidden in the pregap

References 

F